Huaxi Subdistrict is a subdistrict in Xixiu District, Anshun, Guizhou, China. , it has 12 residential communities and 9 villages under its administration.

See also 
 List of township-level divisions of Guizhou

References 

Subdistricts of Guizhou
Anshun